Nigel Lawson, Baron Lawson of Blaby,  (born 11 March 1932) is a British retired Conservative Party politician and journalist. He was a Member of Parliament representing the constituency of Blaby from 1974 to 1992, and served in the cabinet of Margaret Thatcher from 1981 to 1989. Prior to entering the Cabinet, he served as the Financial Secretary to the Treasury from May 1979 until his promotion to Secretary of State for Energy. He was appointed Chancellor of the Exchequer in June 1983, and served until his resignation in October 1989. In both Cabinet posts, Lawson was a key proponent of Thatcher's policies of privatisation of several key industries.

Lawson was a backbencher from 1989 until he retired in 1992, and sat in the House of Lords from 1992 to his retirement on 31 December 2022. He has remained active in politics as President of Conservatives for Britain, a campaign for Britain to leave the European Union, and is a prominent critic of the European Union. He also served as chairman of The Global Warming Policy Foundation think tank, and was an active supporter of Vote Leave.

Lawson is the father of six children, including Nigella Lawson, a food writer and celebrity cook, Dominic Lawson, a journalist, and Tom Lawson, headmaster of Eastbourne College.

Early life and education
Lawson was born on 11 March 1932 to a non-orthodox Jewish family living in Hampstead, London. His father, Ralph Lawson (1904–1982), was the owner of a tea-trading firm in the City of London, while his mother, Joan Elizabeth (Davis), was also from a prosperous family of stockbrokers. His paternal grandfather, Gustav Leibson, a merchant from Mitau (now Jelgava in Latvia), changed his name from Leibson to Lawson in 1925, having become a British subject in 1911.

Lawson was educated at Westminster School in London (following in his father's footsteps), and Christ Church, Oxford, where he gained a first-class honours degree in Philosophy, politics and economics.

Life and career
Lawson carried out his National Service as a Royal Navy officer, during which time he commanded the fast-patrol boat HMS Gay Charger.

Lawson began his career as a journalist at the Financial Times in 1956, subsequently writing the Lex column. He progressed to the positions of City editor of The Sunday Telegraph in 1961 – where he introduced Jim Slater's Capitalist investing column – and then editor of The Spectator (1966–1970).

Early political career
Lawson stood unsuccessfully at the 1970 general election for the Eton and Slough seat, before becoming the Member of Parliament for Blaby in Leicestershire in February 1974, which he held until retiring at the 1992 general election.

While in Opposition, Lawson co-ordinated tactics with rebellious Government backbenchers Jeff Rooker and Audrey Wise to secure legislation providing for the automatic indexation of tax thresholds to prevent the tax burden being increased by inflation (typically in excess of 10% per annum during that Parliament).

In government

Financial Secretary to the Treasury
On the election of Margaret Thatcher's government, Lawson was appointed to the post of Financial Secretary to the Treasury. Although this is the fourth-ranking political position in the UK Treasury, Lawson's energy in office was reflected in such measures as the ending of unofficial state controls on mortgage lending, the abolition of exchange controls in October 1979 and the publication of the Medium Term financial Strategy. This document set the course for both the monetary and fiscal sides of the new government's economic policy, though the extent to which the subsequent trajectory of policy and outcome matched that projected is still a matter for debate.

Secretary of State for Energy
In the Cabinet reshuffle of September 1981, Lawson was promoted to the position of Secretary of State for Energy. In this role his most significant action was to prepare for what he saw as an inevitable full-scale strike in the coal industry (then state-owned since nationalisation by the post-war Labour party government of Clement Attlee) over the closure of deep coal mines whose uneconomic operation accounted for the coal industry's business losses and consequent requirement for state subsidy. He was a key proponent of the Thatcher Government's privatisation policy. During his tenure at the Department of Energy he set the course for the later privatisations of the gas and electricity industries and on his return to the Treasury he worked closely with the Department of Trade and Industry in privatising British Airways, British Telecom, and British Gas.

Chancellor of the Exchequer

Following the Thatcher Government's re-election in 1983, Lawson was appointed Chancellor of the Exchequer in succession to Geoffrey Howe. The early years of Lawson's chancellorship were associated with tax reform. The 1984 Budget reformed corporate taxes by a combination of reduced rates and reduced allowances. The 1985 Budget continued the trend of shifting from direct to indirect taxes by reducing National Insurance contributions for the lower-paid while extending the base of value added tax.

During these two years Lawson's public image remained low-key, but from the 1986 Budget (in which he resumed the reduction of the standard rate of personal Income tax from the 30% rate to which it had been lowered in Howe's 1979 Budget), his stock rose as unemployment began to fall from the middle of 1986 (employment growth having resumed over three years earlier). Lawson also changed the budget deficit from £10.5 billion (3.7% of GDP) in 1983 to a budget surplus of £3.9 billion in 1988 and £4.1 billion in 1989, the year of his resignation. During these years, however, the UK's current account deficit similarly rose from below 1% of GDP in 1986 to almost 5% in 1989, with Lawson asserting that an external deficit based on private-sector behaviour is no reason for concern. During his tenure the rate of taxation also came down. The basic rate was reduced from 30% in 1983 to 25% by 1988. The top rate of tax also came down from 60% to 40% in 1988 and the four other higher rates were removed, leaving a system of personal taxation in which there was no rate anywhere in excess of 40%.  

In 1986, the City of London's financial markets were deregulated in the so-called 'Big Bang'. In an interview in 2010, Lawson said that an unintended consequence of the Big Bang and the associated end of the separation that had existed between merchant and retail banking was the financial crisis of 2007–2008.

The trajectory taken by the UK economy from this point on is typically described as "The Lawson Boom" by analogy with the phrase "The Barber Boom" which describes an earlier period of rapid expansion under the tenure as Chancellor of Anthony Barber in the Conservative Government of Prime Minister Heath (1970 to 1974). Critics of Lawson assert that a combination of the abandonment of monetarism, the adoption of a de facto exchange-rate target of 3 Deutsche Marks to the pound, and excessive fiscal laxity (in particular the 1988 Budget) unleashed an inflationary spiral.

Lawson, in his own defence, attributes the boom largely to the effects of various measures of financial deregulation. Insofar as Lawson acknowledges policy errors, he attributes them to a failure to raise interest rates during 1986 and considers that had Margaret Thatcher not vetoed the UK joining the European Exchange Rate Mechanism in November 1985 it might have been possible to adjust to these beneficial changes in the arena of microeconomics with less Macroeconomics turbulence. Lawson also ascribes the difficulty of conducting monetary policy to Goodhart's law.

Lawson's tax cuts, beginning in 1986, resulted in the "Lawson Boom" of the British economy, which halved unemployment from more than 3,000,000 by the end of 1989. However, this might have led to a rise in inflation from 3% to more than 8% during 1988, which resulted in interest rates doubling to 15% in the space of 18 months, and remaining high in spite of the 1990–1992 recession which saw unemployment rise nearly as high as the level seen before the boom began.

Lawson reflected on the 1987 general election in his memoir and wrote that the 1987 manifesto was not thought through properly and if it had not been for the economic growth of the country at the time then the manifesto would have been a disaster because "as it was, it was merely an embarrassment".

The budget in March 1988 was remembered for taking almost two hours to deliver due to continuous interruptions and protest from opposition members. Scottish National Party MP Alex Salmond was suspended from the House and several MPs voted against the amendment of the law bill (which is typically agreed by all members of the House).

Lawson opposed the introduction of the Community Charge (nicknamed the poll tax) as a replacement for the previous rating system for the local financing element of local government revenue. His dissent was confined to deliberations within the Cabinet, where he found few allies and where he was over-ruled by the Prime Minister and by the ministerial team of the department responsible (Department of the Environment).

The issue of exchange-rate mechanism membership continued to fester between Lawson and Thatcher and was exacerbated by the re-employment by Thatcher of Alan Walters as personal economic adviser. Lawson's conduct of policy had become a struggle to maintain credibility once the August 1988 trade deficit revealed the strength of the expansion of domestic demand. As orthodox monetarists, Lawson and Thatcher agreed to a steady rise in interest rates to restrain demand, but this had the effect of inflating the headline inflation figure.

Resignation
After a further year in office in these circumstances, Lawson felt that public criticism from Walters (who favoured a floating exchange rate), was making his job impossible and he resigned. He was succeeded in the office of Chancellor by John Major.

Lawson's tenure as Chancellor of the Exchequer was longer than that of any of his predecessors since David Lloyd George, who served from 1908 to 1915. This was subsequently passed by Labour's Gordon Brown (1997–2007).

Retirement
After retiring from front-bench politics, Lawson decided to tackle his weight problem. He is 5 feet 9 inches (175 cm) tall; he lost five stone (70 pounds, 30 kg) from 17 stone, or 238 pounds (108 kg) to 12 stone, or 168 pounds (76 kilograms) – (BMI 34 to 24) in a matter of a few months, dramatically changing his appearance, and went on to publish the best-selling The Nigel Lawson Diet Book.

On 1 July 1992, Lawson was given a life peerage as Baron Lawson of Blaby, of Newnham in the County of Northamptonshire.

In 1996, Lawson appeared on the BBC satirical and topical quiz show Have I Got News for You and, as a former Chancellor (the position of Chancellor being one of the Great Offices of State) he had held the highest political office of any guest. He occasionally appears as a guest on his daughter Nigella's cookery shows.

Lawson served on the advisory board of the Conservative magazine Standpoint.

In 2013, Lawson advocated Britain leaving the EU. He argued that 'economic gains [from leaving the EU] would substantially outweigh the costs'. In the 2016 EU referendum, he supported Leave and was appointed chairman of the Vote Leave campaign.

Corporate roles
 2007: Chairman of Central Europe Trust Company Ltd (CET)
 2007: Chairman of Oxford Investment Partners

Expenses scandal
During the United Kingdom parliamentary expenses scandal, it was reported that Lawson claimed £16,000 in overnight allowances by registering his farmhouse in Gascony as his main residence.

Position on global warming
Lawson is involved with the climate change denial movement, and believes that the impact of man-made global warming has been exaggerated.

In 2004, along with six others, Lawson wrote a letter to The Times opposing the Kyoto Protocol and claiming that there were substantial scientific uncertainties surrounding climate change. In 2005, the House of Lords Economics Affairs Select Committee, with Lawson as a member, undertook an inquiry into climate change. In their report, the Committee recommended the HM Treasury take a more active role in climate policy, questioned the objectivity of the IPCC process, and suggested changes in the UK's contribution to future international climate change negotiations. The report cited a mismatch between the economic costs and benefits of climate policy, and also criticises the greenhouse gas emission reduction targets set in the Kyoto Protocol. In response to the report, Michael Grubb, Chief Economist of the Carbon Trust, wrote an article in Prospect magazine, defending the Kyoto Protocol and describing the committee's report as being "strikingly inconsistent". Lawson responded to Grubb's article, describing it as an example of the "intellectual bankruptcy of the [...] climate change establishment". Lawson also said that Kyoto's approach was "wrong-headed" and called on the IPCC to be "shut down".

At about the same time of the release of the House of Lords report, the UK Government launched the Stern Review, an inquiry undertaken by the HM Treasury and headed by Lord Stern of Brentford. According to the Stern Review, published in 2006, the potential costs of climate change far exceed the costs of a programme to stabilise the climate. Lawson's lecture to the Centre for Policy Studies think tank, published 1 November 2006 opposed the Stern Review and advocated adaptation to changes in global climate, rather than reducing greenhouse gas emissions.

In 2008, Lawson published a book expanding on his 2006 lecture to the Centre for Policy Studies, An Appeal to Reason: A Cool Look at Global Warming. He argues the case that, although global warming is happening, the impact of these changes will be relatively moderate rather than apocalyptic. He criticises those "alarmist" politicians and scientists who predict catastrophe unless urgent action is taken.

In July 2008, the Conservative magazine Standpoint published a transcript of a double interview with Lawson and Tory Policy Chief Oliver Letwin, in which Lawson described Letwin's views on global warming as "pie in the sky" and called on him and the Tory frontbench to "get real".

On 23 November 2009, Lawson became chairman of a new think tank, The Global Warming Policy Foundation, a registered education charity, involved in promoting climate change denial.

In 2011, Bob Ward of the Grantham Research Institute said that the GWPF was "spreading errors" and "the 'facts'" Lawson "repeats are demonstrably inaccurate". Ward also criticised Lawson for repeating in a 2010 BBC radio debate that Antarctic ice volumes were unchanged even after his error was highlighted by his opponent, Professor Kevin Anderson. Ward said that Lawson provided no evidence to back his claim which is contrary to satellite measurements, and Lawson similarly incorrectly implied that the correlation between CO2 and sea levels was uncertain as well as that sea levels were rising more slowly since 1950 than before it.

The Charity Commission requires that statements by campaigning charities "must be factually accurate and have a legitimate evidence base". They reviewed the GWPF, which was subsequently split with its campaigning arm renamed the Global Warming Policy Forum without charitable status, while the charitable section retained the original title.
Lawson's son, Dominic Lawson, is also a climate change sceptic, taking a similar viewpoint as his father in his columns in the Independent on Sunday.

In a BBC radio interview in August 2017, Lawson claimed that "official figures" showed "average world temperature has slightly declined" over the preceding decade, and that experts in the IPCC found no increase in extreme weather events. In a follow-up programme on the BBC's presentation of these claims, Peter A. Stott of the UK Met Office said Lawson was wrong on both points.

Economy
Lawson was a critic of David Cameron's coalition government economic policy, describing spending cuts consultation plans as a "PR ploy". In November 2011, he called for the "orderly" dismantling of the euro.

In the media
Lawson was interviewed about the rise of Thatcherism for the 2006 BBC TV documentary series Tory! Tory! Tory!.

In 2010, he appeared on the Analysis programme to discuss banking reform. Lawson said that an unintended consequence of the 1986 Big Bang saw investment banks merge with high street banks and put their depositors' savings at risk.

In 2019, he appeared on the BBC documentary series Thatcher: A Very British Revolution, and discussed Thatcher's rise and fall.

In a debate with other former cabinet ministers and prominent journalists, Lawson has argued that political life is more in need of ideas and direction than grand political visions.

Personal and family life
Lawson has been married twice, having children from both marriages.
 Vanessa Salmon (married 1955; marriage dissolved 1980), whose family founded the Lyons Corner House chain, with the following issue:
 Dominic (born 1956). Journalist.
 Nigella (born 1960). Cook and author.
 Thomasina (1961–1993). Died from breast cancer at 32.
 Horatia (born 1966)
 Thérèse Maclear (married 1980; marriage dissolved 2012) with the following issue:
 Tom (born 1976). Headmaster of Eastbourne College since 2016.
 Emily (born 1981). Television producer.

Lawson is a member of the Garrick Club.

In 2018, Lawson was residing in France, and had applied for leave to remain in France. However, in 2019 he said that he remained a tax resident of the UK and was selling his house in France.

Bibliography
 An Appeal to Reason: A Cool Look at Global Warming (2008)
 Thatcherism in Practice: A Progress Report
 The Retreat of the State
 The View from No.11: Memoirs of a Tory Radical
 The Nigel Lawson Diet Book (1996)
 The Power Game: An Examination of Decision Making in Government
 Conservatism Today: Four Personal Points of View By Robert Blake, Peregrine Worsthorne, David Howell and Nigel Lawson
 State of the Market (Occasional Papers S.)
 The Great Global Warming Swindle (2007)

References

Further reading
 Dell, Edmund. The Chancellors: A History of the Chancellors of the Exchequer, 1945–90 (HarperCollins, 1997) pp. 490–540, covers his term as Chancellor.
 Henderson, David, Nigel Lawson, and Milton Friedman. The Changing Fortunes of Economic Liberalism: Yesterday, Today and Tomorrow (Institute of Economic affairs, 1998).
 Lawson, Nigel. The View from No. 11: Memoirs of a Tory Radical (1992) 1152 pages; abridged edition titled  Memoirs of a Tory Radical (2011) 450pp.
 Lawson, Nigel. The New Conservatism (Centre for Policy Studies, 1980).
 Tomlinson, Jim. "Mrs Thatcher's macroeconomic adventurism, 1979–1981, and its political consequences." British Politics 2.1 (2007): 3-19 online.

External links

 
 
 
 www.burkespeerage.com

|-

|-

|-

|-

|-

1932 births
Alumni of Christ Church, Oxford
British Secretaries of State
Chancellors of the Exchequer of the United Kingdom
Conservative Party (UK) life peers
Conservative Party (UK) MPs for English constituencies
English people of Latvian-Jewish descent
Jewish British politicians
Living people
Non-fiction environmental writers
People educated at Westminster School, London
The Spectator editors
UK MPs 1974
UK MPs 1974–1979
UK MPs 1979–1983
UK MPs 1983–1987
UK MPs 1987–1992
Diet food writers
English memoirists
People from Hampstead
British Eurosceptics
Life peers created by Elizabeth II